King Erb (also, in Latin, Urbanus) (c.524 – c.555) was the king of Gwent and Glywysing, kingdoms in the south of Wales in the Early Middle Ages.

Life
According to later genealogies, Erb was the son of King Meurig ap Caradog's son, Erbig. Nothing is known of his life. After Erb's death in the mid-6th century, his kingdom was divided between his young sons. Nynnio became king of Gwent and Glywysing and Peibio became the ruler of Ergyng.

6th-century deaths
Monarchs of Gwent
Monarchs of Morgannwg
6th-century Welsh monarchs
Year of birth unknown